Stade de Penvillers is a multi-use stadium in Quimper, France. It is currently used mostly for football matches and is the home stadium of Quimper Kerfeunteun F.C. The stadium is able to hold 7,758 spectators.

The stadium is named Stade de Penvillers because this is the area where the stadium is located.

References

External links
 Quimper : la tribune de Penvillers sera détruite (in French)

Penvillers
Sports venues in Finistère
Sports venues completed in 1968
1968 establishments in France